Child of the Universe may refer to:

Music
"A Child of the Universe Op. 80", a 1971 composition by Wilfred Josephs

Albums
Child of the Universe (album), a 2012 album by Delta Goodrem
Child of the Universe, a 2009 album by Screwdriver

Songs
"Child of the Universe", a 1974 single by Barclay James Harvest from Everyone Is Everybody Else
"Child of the Universe", a 1969 song by The Byrds from Dr. Byrds & Mr. Hyde
"Child of the Universe", a 1999 single by DJ Taucher
"Child of the Universe", a song by Robyn Hitchcock from the 1991 album Perspex Island
"Desiderata", a song on Les Crane's 1971 album Desiderata, which repeats in its chorus "You are a child of the universe"

See also
Children of the Universe (disambiguation)